The Ontario Orioles were a minor league baseball team that operated in 1947 as part of the Class-C Sunset League. They were based in Ontario, California and played at the Ontario Baseball Park. The team was managed by Danny Reagan and finished their one season of existence with a 64–75 record. The team was owned by former Major Leaguer Babe Dahlgren (per Jun/7/1947 UP-syndicated article in Pittsburgh Press, page 6).

External links
 Baseball Reference

Defunct Sunset League teams
Professional baseball teams in California
1947 establishments in California
1947 disestablishments in California
Baseball teams established in 1947
Baseball teams disestablished in 1947
Sports in Ontario, California
Defunct baseball teams in California